HBM may refer to:

Science and technology
 HBM (gene), a human gene
 High Bandwidth Memory, a computer memory standard
 Health belief model
 Hierarchical Bayes model
 Human-body model

Other uses
 Havelock-Belmont-Methuen, a township in Peterborough County, Ontario, Canada
 His or Her Britannic Majesty
 Hitman: Blood Money, a video game
 Hudbay, a Canadian mining company
 Hummingbird Medal, a state decoration of Trinidad and Tobago
 , the predecessor of the French HLM housing program